Santiago del Nuevo Extremo is a Chilean band formed in 1978, at Santiago, Chile. It was one of the most important bands of the Canto Nuevo music movement during Pinochet’s dictatorship. The band was named after the original name of Santiago de Chile when it was founded by Pedro de Valdivia on 1541.

It has shared a stage in multiple occasions with Inti-Illimani, and some of its members would go on to found the jazz-rock band Fulano.

Discography

Studio albums 
 1981 - A mi ciudad 
 1983 - Hasta encontrarnos
 1985 - Barricadas 
 2000 - Salvo tú y yo
 2011 - Leuda
 2016 - Santiago del Nuevo Extremo

Live albums 
 2001 - Santiago del Nuevo Extremo en vivo

Compilation almbums 
 1998 - Lo mejor de Santiago del Nuevo Extremo, vol 1 
 2001 - Lo mejor de Santiago del Nuevo Extremo, vol 2

References 

Musical groups established in 1978
Chilean folk musical groups
Nueva canción musicians